Robert "Bob" Nichols (born January 27, 1948, in Superior, Wisconsin) is an American curler.

He played at the 1988 Winter Olympics when curling was a demonstration sport, USA men's team finished on fourth place. He played also at the 1992 Winter Olympics when curling was a demonstration sport, USA men's team won bronze medal.

Awards
 United States Curling Association Hall of Fame:
 1990 (as curler);
 2017 (with all 1974 world champions team: skip Bud Somerville, second Bill Strum and lead Tom Locken);
 2017 (with all 1978 world champions team: third Bill Strum, second Tom Locken and lead Bob Christman).

Teams

References

External links

Video: 

Living people
1948 births
People from Superior, Wisconsin
American male curlers
World curling champions
American curling champions
Curlers at the 1988 Winter Olympics
Curlers at the 1992 Winter Olympics
Olympic curlers of the United States